Mara Guth (born 24 June 2003) is a German professional tennis player.

Guth has a career-high junior ranking of No. 14 in the world, achieved on 6 September 2021. She has won three ITF Junior singles titles, including two at Grade 2 level, and has won six ITF Junior doubles titles, including one Grade 1 title.

Guth made her WTA Tour main-draw debut at the 2021 Bad Homburg Open where she was handed a wildcard. She was defeated in the first round by Nadia Podoroska. She also made her main-draw debut in doubles at the same event, partnering Julia Middendorf, but the pair lost in the first round.

ITF Circuit finals

Singles: 1 (runner-up)

Doubles: 1 (runner-up)

ITF Junior Circuit finals

Singles (3–2)

Doubles (6–1)

References

External links
 
 

2003 births
Living people
German female tennis players